The Islamic Azad University, Science and Research Branch, Tehran (Dāneshgāh-e Āzād-e Eslāmi Vāhed-e Olum va Tahghighāt Tehrān) is a private research university located in Tehran, Iran. It is an independent comprehensive branch of the Islamic Azad University system.

History

The Science and Research Branch of the Islamic Azad University was established in November 1984 with the objective of ‘enhancing the youth education enabling them to specialize and be efficient’. In Tehran, the SRBIAU began activities with the enrolment of 250 students in humanities, engineering, basic sciences and agriculture.

SRBIAU grew fast and is now home to 13 faculties and 17 research centers offering 700 disciplines at undergraduate and graduate levels with a total of over 45,000 students. The academic staff includes 1700 highly qualified full-time and part-time members as well as visiting professors from notable personalities in the realm of science and research.

SRBIAU finances are essentially based on tuition fees, although in recent years the university is attempting to diversify its sources of income through commercialization of its research activities.

Activities of SRBIAU have brought considerable benefits to the country, including the establishment of a number of research centers such as a Gene Bank, registration of a number of inventions by student body and conduct of several research projects. The graduate and PhD students of the SRBIAU along with the faculty members have published numerous papers in ISI journals paving the way for accomplishing and promoting the mission and vision of the university.

Campus
SRBIAU campus in Tehran is located in area 5 (north west of Tehran) above Punk Square. The campus has 50 buses.

Administration
The office of the president incorporates general directorates dealing with international affairs, gender issues and public relations.
Four vice–presidents dealing with administrative and financial issues, cultural and student affairs, research and technology, academic and graduate affairs support the president.

A Council of vice-presidents, a Management Council and a Council of SRBIAU Sub-branches are the major consultative and advisory bodies. Each faculty is headed by a dean with considerable authority.  Deans are members of the Management Council.

Rector

Faculties
The university is made up of 13 faculties, all of them are subdivided into further departments.

Faculty of Engineering
Faculty of Mechanical, Electrical and Computer Engineering
Faculty of Chemical and Petroleum Engineering
Faculty of Civil Engineering
Faculty of Basic Sciences
Faculty of Arts and Architecture
Faculty of Medical Sciences and Technologies
Faculty of Agriculture and Food Industries
Faculty of Natural Resources and Environment
Faculty of Veterinary Sciences
Faculty of Literature, Humanities and Social Sciences 
Faculty of Law, Theology and Political Science
Faculty of Management and Economics

Faculty of Basic Sciences
The faculty was founded in 1986 and began its work as an independent institution from 1999. Biology and Geology were amongst the earliest disciplines offered by the Faculty. During the 1993-1994 periods, the first post-graduate level course (M.Sc.) on Biology-genetics was approved and launched. In 1995 new disciplines i.e. Marine Biology, Marine Physics and Mathematics were added. Same year it accepted PhD level students in Mathematics. In 2003, the FBS admitted undergraduate students in General Biology and Plant Biology. Presently the Faculty offers education and research at graduate, post graduate and Decorate levels to 1790 students in 54 disciplines and sub-disciplines.

Faculty of Aerospace and Mechanical engineering
Faculty of Mechanical and Aerospace Engineering (FMAE), originally a part of the Faculty of Engineering, was separated from that faculty to begin work as an independent body in 2008 reflecting the broad range of its interest and the high number of its students and academic staff. The main goal of this faculty is to educate and train students in mathematics, physics, mechanics and aerospace sciences to develop, strengthen and enhance abilities to analyze, model, build, measure, design and implement solutions throughout a broad spectrum of engineering fields. The faculty offers B.Sc., M.Sc. and PhD in both mechanical and aerospace engineering and has nearly 50 faculty members.

Faculty of Marine Science and Technologies
The Faculty of Marine Science and Technology (FMSE) aiming to improve the qualitative and quantitative aspects of oceanographic disciplines, officially started its work in 2005 and is now home to over 420 students studying at post-graduate and doctorate levels.

The faculty's departments include: Marine Industries (Civil Engineering - Marine Structures, Shipbuilding - Ship Architecture), Marine Biology (Marine Animals, Marine Pollution, and Ecology), Marine Chemistry and Physics.

The FMST owns specialized laboratories at the Zakariya Razi and Sheykh Bahaee complexes at SRBIIAU.  It is also pursuing the design and establishment of the International Institute for Research of Delvar, on the northern coast the Persian Gulf, to promote research and development on marine engineering and Sciences and to contribute to aquaculture. The institute is planned to enter into construction phase in early 2011.

Faculty of Humanities and Social Sciences
The Faculty of Humanities and Social Sciences (FHSS) is one of the earliest entities of the SRBIAU having begun its activities at the time of its foundation under the title of Social Sciences Education encompassing four faculties covering social sciences, economics and management, law and political science, and divinity and philosophy. Following the formation and separation of three independent faculties — Economics and Management, Law and Political Sciences, and Divinity and Philosophy; this early structure evolved and transformed into the Faculty of Humanities and Social Sciences (FHSS) upon the approval of the SRBIAU management and endorsement of the president of the Islamic Azad University. Up to 2004 the faculty was under the auspices of the SRBIAU Education Deputy but since has been working as an independent entity.

Faculty of Art and Architecture
The Faculty of Art and Architecture started working independently in 2004, with the aim of training professionals in architecture and urbanism fields. Currently it has 149 students in doctoral level, 383 graduate students, 10 full-time faculty members, 6 part-time and 8 visiting faculty members.
This Faculty offers PhD in Architecture and Urban Planning and post -graduate degree in architecture, Urban Designing, Urban Planning and Regional Planning.

Faculty of Natural Resources and Environment
The faculty began activities in 1990 in three major disciplines: Environmental Engineering, Environmental Management and Environmental Sciences, at post-graduate and PhD levels. Since the first semester of 2003-2004 the faculty is offering master's degree in Environmental Law and Environmental Economics, these being sub-disciplines of Environmental Management. Starting with the first semester of 2004–2005, Environment Design Engineering and Water Resources, being sub-disciplines of Environmental Engineering, have admitted students at the Masters level. From 2004 to 2005 the Energy Engineering has also been included in the faculty.

Faculty of Biomedical Engineering
The Science and Research Branch is the only branch of the Islamic Azad University which is active at all levels and in all disciplines pertaining to medical engineering. The Faculty of Medical Engineering formally began its activities in 1998 with the admission of students at undergraduate and graduate levels (BS, MS and PhD) in bio-electric, bio-mechanics, and bio-materials. Since 2004 the faculty has been offering degrees in clinical disciplines.

Faculty of Foreign Languages
The Faculty of Foreign Languages and Literature (FFLL) began its activities under the auspices of the Faculty of Human Sciences in 1985 offering doctorate level education in English Language. The number of courses and sub-disciplines offered in languages and literature increased rapidly and by 1996 the FFLL included ten educational departments

On 23 May 2005, the Faculty formally turned into an independent entity as the Faculty of Foreign Languages and Literature. In September 2006, to increase the education spaces, it moved to a new building in South Jannat Abad Street. In April 2018 it moved to the main place of the university in Hesarak among the other faculties.

The departments at the FFLL include:
 Graduate level:  French Language and Literature and French Language Translation
 Post graduate level: French language and literature, French language Translation, Persian Language and Literature, Arabic Language and Literature, English Language Teaching, English Language Translation, German language Teaching, Ancient Culture and Languages and Linguistics
 Doctorate level:  French Language and Literature, Persian Language and Literature, Arab Language and Literature, English language Teaching, German language and Literature, Ancient Iranian Culture and Languages and Linguistics.

Faculty of Food Sciences and Engineering
The Faculty of Food Sciences and Engineering (FFSE) was established and began to admit students in 1999. Up to now, the FFSE has trained some 5,100 graduates in a number of disciplines including Agricultural Engineering: Food Science and Technology, Chemical Engineering: Food, and Nutritional Sciences. The faculty with some 1818 square meter of built- space is constructed on four floors in an area of 994 square and enjoys facilities such as conference halls, computer sites, prayer houses, a dining hall for faculty staff and a buffet for students.

Faculty of Engineering
The Faculty of Engineering has 6500 square meters of built space and a five-story building. Adjacent to the faculty is the Laboratories Building, with 2700 square meters on two floors. Educational and research activities are offered at doctorates, post-graduate and graduate levels. The FE has 1574 undergraduate students, 1176 graduate students and 377 doctoral students. Current courses offered at the FE include 30 disciplines in 11 sub-disciplines at graduate level, 11 disciplines in 35 sub-disciplines at post- graduate level and 11 disciplines in 30 sub-disciplines at doctorate level. There are 141 faculty members. In addition, some 200 visiting professors per semester, in coordination with the deans of faculty departments, help the students in their education and research. Currently the number of students at all levels are 3135, and so far about 2817 students have graduated from this department.

Faculty of Law and Political Science
The Faculty of Law and Political Sciences (FLPS) was founded in May 2003 following the establishment of separate independent entities dealing with humanities.

The faculty started its activities as an independent entity in a single room, the work office of the Politics and International Relations Department, with one staff member with support from the Educational Deputy of the Branch. Presently, after some eight years, the faculty has expanded its activities in both education and research enjoying the support of eight staff members.

Currently the faculty has two departments: Political Sciences-International Relations and Law. The Law group has two specialized sub-groups namely, Criminal Law and Criminology and Private, International and Public Law. The Law group has 10 full-time and 13 part-time professors and the Political Science and International Relations group has 8 full-time and 6 part-time professors.the main professors in criminal law are: dr ashoury, dr mahdavisabet, dr ardebili, dr safary, dr aghaeinia, dr shambayati, dr mehra, dr samavaty.
Notable alumni: Mohammad Hossein Farhanghi, Ali Tajari, Jalel Maleki

Faculty of Management and Economics
Management related disciplines were amongst the first to be offered at PhD level at the Science and Research Branch of the Islamic Azad University (SRBIAU). Initially the PhD degree was research-based but later on Comprehensive Examination and course works became mandatory, requirements that were retroactively applied to the first PhD graduates. At the start only PhD level students were admitted but gradually graduate and post-graduate courses were offered.

In tandem with the growth in the number of students and the disciplines the faculty has endeavored to attract from within the country and abroad prominent, quality and experienced full-time, part-time and visiting academic staff. Currently the faculty has some 3000 students studying at graduate to doctorate levels. The faculty with 1500 square meter of built space is located in the main campus of the SRBIAU.

Faculty of Divinity and Philosophy
The Faculty of Divinity and Philosophy (FDP) started its work in 1982 as a new academic center of SRBIAU; however, although some of the courses offered by the faculty goes back to the time when SRBIAU was established. The FDP includes 14 departments at post-graduate and doctorate levels. From the time of its establishment FDP has had many graduates at who currently serve in universities and research centers in the country.

Faculty of Material Engineering
The department of Material Engineering of SRBIAU was established in 1997. At the time of its inception, the faculty admitted students at graduate level but later it welcomed the students at all undergraduate, graduate and postgraduate levels. At first, the department was affiliated with the Faculty of Engineering, but it has been separated and independently continued its activities since March, 2004. The FME now offers two disciplines at undergraduate level, i.e., Material Engineering-Industrial Metallurgy, and Material Engineering-Ceramic; and three disciplines at graduate level, i.e., Material Engineering-Ceramic, Material Engineering-Welding, Material Engineering-Material corrosion and protection; and admits students in Material Engineering at PhD level. Currently, the Faculty is home to 848 BA students, 224 MA students and 28 PhD students. The FME is proud of its 950 BA graduates, 250 MA graduates, and 3 PhD graduates.

The Faculty of Material Engineering includes 12 full-time and 9 part-time faculty members and runs eleven laboratories and specialized workshops of ceramic, material processing, welding, heating operations, congelation, molding, surface corrosion and engineering, mechanical properties, metallography, Scanning Electron Microscope (SEM), and Transmission Scanning Microscope (TEM). This faculty joined the faculty of Engineering in 2019.

Faculty of Chemical and Petroleum Engineering
Established in 2006, the Faculty is offering BSc, MSc and PhD degrees in a number of Chemical, oil and gas related fields while being equally active in advanced research and technology.

Research 

In recent year the IAU has placed special importance on research activities. SRBIAU, as the pioneering branch of the university, has built up unique research and laboratory facilities and is rapidly and considerably enhancing its research capabilities. In this connection and towards promoting the international standing of the IAU, the Plasma Physic Research Centre is actively engaged in publishing ISI papers, taking part in reputable international gatherings and conducting research projects at national and international levels. The performance of the centre in recent years is indicative of its exponential growth in registered scientific activities.

Research centers

 Center for Environment and Energy Research and Studies  (CEERS)
 Plasma Physics Research Center (Plasma Physics Research Center)
 Center for Strategic Studies
 Nano Research Laboratory Tehran (Ultrasonic Research Lab) -  
and 14 other research centers.

Plasma Physics Research Center
The Plasma Physics Research Centre (PPRC) was established in 1994 initiating applied research in the fields of Atomic-Molecular Physics (plasma, laser and bio-photonic), Solid Physics (superficies, thin layers, semi conductors and nano-technology), Fundamental particles Physics (Theoretical).
Currently and in line with the national social and economic development programs, the centre is pursuing a wide range of cooperation with other universities and research centers at the national and international levels.

Aiming to develop and promote science and technology the centre is carrying out fundamental and applied research projects, in the field of Solid Physics and Atomic-Molecular Physics. The centre, being one of the most active in Plasma Physics in the country is now expanding its activities to cover nuclear fusion.

Notable alumni and people

Gallery

See also

 Higher Education in Iran
 List of universities in Iran
 Islamic Azad University
 Islamic Azad University Central Tehran Branch
 Islamic Azad University South Tehran Branch
 Islamic Azad University North Tehran Branch

References

External links
Official Website of the Islamic Azad University
Official Website of the Science & Research University
Ministry of Science, Research & Technology 
Education System in Islamic Azad University

Educational institutions established in 1984
s
1984 establishments in Iran
Universities in Tehran